Queula is a census town in North Goa district in the Indian state of Goa.

Geography
It has an average elevation of 86 metres (282 feet).

Demographics
 India census, Queula had a population of 5452. Males constitute 52% of the population and females 48%. Queula has an average literacy rate of 80%, higher than the national average of 59.5%: male literacy is 85%, and female literacy is 74%. In Queula, 9% of the population is under 6 years of age.

References

Cities and towns in North Goa district